The Elizabeth Cady Stanton Pregnant and Parenting Student Services Act would establish a pilot program to provide $10 million annually for 200 grants to encourage institutions of higher education to establish and operate a pregnant and parenting student services office.   The on-campus office would serve parenting students, prospective student parents who are pregnant or imminently anticipating an adoption, and students who are placing or have placed a child for adoption.  It is named in honor of the prominent suffragist, Elizabeth Cady Stanton.



109th United States Congress 

The act was introduced by Senator Elizabeth Dole (R-NC) on November 8, 2005 as S. 1966.   It was referred to the Committee on Health, Education, Labor, and Pensions.  It was co-sponsored by Senators Mike DeWine (R-OH) and Rick Santorum (R-PA).  On the following day, the House version of the act was introduced by Congresswoman Melissa Hart (R-PA) as H.R. 4265   and was referred to the House Committee on Education and the Workforce.  On March 24, 2006 it was referred to the Subcommittee on 21st Century Competitiveness.  H.R. 4265 had 14 co-sponsors.  4 were Democrats and 10 were Republicans.

110th United States Congress 
 
On February 15, 2007, in commemoration of the birthday of Susan B. Anthony, 
  It had 12 co-sponsors.  4 were Democrats and 8 were Republicans. It was co-sponsored by Senators Ben Nelson (D-NE) and Robert Casey (D-PA). On Jun 5, 2007 H.R. 1088 was referred to the Subcommittee on Higher Education, Lifelong Learning, and Competitiveness.

References

Proposed legislation of the 109th United States Congress
Proposed legislation of the 110th United States Congress
United States federal education legislation
Elizabeth Cady Stanton